Pushkarnoye is a rural locality (a selo) and the administrative center of Pushkarskoye  Rural Settlement, Belgorodsky District, Belgorod Oblast, Russia. Population:    There are 94 streets.

Geography 
Pushkarnoye is located 16 km north of Maysky (the district's administrative centre) by road. Dragunskoye is the nearest rural locality.

References 

Rural localities in Belgorodsky District
Belgorodsky Uyezd